Morley is a civil parish in the South Norfolk district, in the county of Norfolk, England. It includes the villages of Morley St Botolph and Morley St Peter.

History 
The name is first attested in 1086 as Morlea, which probably meant "open ground by a pasture/clearing", from Old English mōr "moor, clearing, pasture" + lẽah "open ground, clearing".

The parish was formed on 1 April 1935 from "Morley St Botolph" and "Morley St Peter".

See also
Wymondham College

Notes

External links

Civil parishes in Norfolk
South Norfolk